The Indian River is a river in Peterborough County in Central Ontario, Canada. It is in the Great Lakes Basin, and is a tributary of Rice Lake.

Course
The river begins at Stony Lake in the municipality of Douro-Dummer. It exits the lake at Gilchrist Bay (and the settlement of Gilchrist Bay)) over Gilchrist Bay Dam and heads southwest. It flows through Tilley's Hole and through the Warsaw Caves Conservation Area, where a short portion of the watercourse flows underground. It passes the community of Warsaw, and takes in the right tributary May's Creek. The river continues southwest into the municipality of Otonabee – South Monaghan, and passes under the Kawartha Lakes Railway and then under Ontario Highway 7. The Indian River continues south, through the Hope Mill Conservation Area and Lang Pioneer Village at the community of Lang, flows through the community of Keene, and reaches its mouth at Rice Lake, which flows via the Trent River to Lake Ontario.

Watershed
The Indian River drainage basin encompasses  of land in two physiographic regions: the Peterborough Drumlin Field and Dummer Moraine.

Tributaries
May's Creek (right)

See also  
List of rivers of Ontario

References

Sources

Rivers of Peterborough County